Begoña Aretxaga (1960-2002) was a Basque anthropologist known for her work on Northern Ireland and Basque country. She studied at the University of the Basque Country and Princeton University where she lectured. She also worked at Harvard University and near the end of her life she taught at the University of Texas at Austin.

References 

Basque women
People from San Sebastián
University of the Basque Country alumni
Princeton University alumni
Harvard University faculty
University of Texas at Austin faculty
Spanish anthropologists
Spanish women anthropologists
1960 births
2002 deaths
20th-century anthropologists